The 2015 Houston Texans season was the franchise's 14th season in the National Football League and the second under head coach Bill O'Brien.

Houston started the season going into their bye week at 3–5, including blowout losses to the Atlanta Falcons (21–48) and against the Miami Dolphins (26–44). However, the Texans had a surge in the second half of the season, going 6–2 after the bye. The 2015 season marked the first time the Texans beat the Colts in Indianapolis, helped in part by third–string quarterback Brandon Weeden. The Texans matched their win total from the 2014 season, finishing 9–7, and gained their first division title and postseason trip since 2012, but were shutout, 30–0, at home by the Kansas City Chiefs in the Wild Card round. 

The 2015 Houston Texans were featured on the HBO documentary series Hard Knocks.

2015 draft class

Staff

Final roster

Schedule

Preseason

Regular season
{| class="wikitable" style="text-align:center"
!style=""| Week
!style=""| Date
!style=""| Opponent
!style=""| Result
!style=""| Record
!style=""| Venue
!style=""| Recap
|-style="background:#fcc"
! 1
| September 13
| Kansas City Chiefs
| L 20–27
| 0–1
| NRG Stadium
| Recap
|-style="background:#fcc"
! 2
| September 20
| at Carolina Panthers
| L 17–24
| 0–2
| Bank of America Stadium
| Recap
|-style="background:#cfc"
! 3
| September 27
| Tampa Bay Buccaneers
| W 19–9
| 1–2
| NRG Stadium
| Recap
|-style="background:#fcc"
! 4
| October 4
| at Atlanta Falcons
| L 21–48
| 1–3
| Georgia Dome
| Recap
|-style="background:#fcc"
! 5
| 
| Indianapolis Colts
| L 20–27
| 1–4
| NRG Stadium
| Recap
|-style="background:#cfc"
! 6
| October 18
| at Jacksonville Jaguars
| W 31–20
| 2–4
| EverBank Field
| Recap
|-style="background:#fcc"
! 7
| October 25
| at Miami Dolphins
| L 26–44
| 2–5
| Sun Life Stadium
| Recap
|-style="background:#cfc"
! 8
| November 1
| Tennessee Titans
| W 20–6
| 3–5
| NRG Stadium
| Recap
|-
! 9
| colspan="6" |Bye
|-style="background:#cfc"
! 10
| 
| at Cincinnati Bengals
| W 10–6
| 4–5
| Paul Brown Stadium
| Recap
|-style="background:#cfc"
! 11
| November 22
| New York Jets
| W 24–17
| 5–5
| NRG Stadium
| Recap
|-style="background:#cfc"
! 12
| November 29
| New Orleans Saints
| W 24–6
| 6–5
| NRG Stadium
| Recap
|-style="background:#fcc"
! 13
| December 6
| at Buffalo Bills
| L 21–30
| 6–6
| Ralph Wilson Stadium
| Recap
|-style="background:#fcc"
! 14
| December 13
| New England Patriots
| L 6–27
| 6–7
| NRG Stadium
| Recap
|-style="background:#cfc"
! 15
| December 20
| at Indianapolis Colts
| W 16–10
| 7–7
| Lucas Oil Stadium
| Recap
|-style="background:#cfc"
! 16
| December 27
| at Tennessee Titans
| W 34–6| 8–7
| Nissan Stadium
| Recap
|-style="background:#cfc"
! 17
| January 3
| Jacksonville Jaguars| W 30–6
| 9–7
| NRG Stadium
| Recap
|}Note: Intra-division opponents are in bold text.

Postseason

Game summaries

Regular season

Week 1: vs. Kansas City Chiefs

In the 2015 season opener, the Houston Texans took on the Kansas City Chiefs with Brian Hoyer in his first regular season start as the Texans' quarterback. Hoyer's first pass was intercepted which eventually led to a Kansas City touchdown. The Chiefs managed to score another 7 points off of turnovers to take a 14–0 lead with 4:28 left in the first. Houston finally managed to get on the board late in the 1st quarter following a 4-yard pass to DeAndre Hopkins from Hoyer. With Randy Bullock missing the extra point the Texans trailed 14–6 with 0:46 left in the 1st. Following another dismal quarter for the Texans, Kansas City led 27–9 at halftime. Houston managed to shut out the Chiefs for the entire second half and with almost 6 minutes left in the game brought Ryan Mallett in as quarterback, who led the team on two scoring drives. Nonetheless the Texans couldn't manage a comeback and fell to the Chiefs 27–20.

Game notes
This is the first time since 2009 where the Texans lost their season opener. Houston kicker Randy Bullock became the first player to miss a point-after attempt following a rule change for the 2015 season, which requires the ball to be snapped from the 15-yard line.

Week 2: at Carolina Panthers

Ryan Mallett was given the starting quarterback position against the Panthers. The Texans' only lead of the game came in the first quarter following a 43-yard field goal from Randy Bullock. Following 10 unanswered points from Carolina in the 2nd quarter, Houston trailed 3-10 going into halftime. Early in the third quarter Houston tied the game at 10 a piece. A Carolina touchdown late in the 3rd quarter and another early in the 4th sealed a Panthers victory as the Texans couldn't manage a comeback. With the loss Houston dropped to 0–2, their worst start since the 2008 season.

Week 3: vs. Tampa Bay Buccaneers

The Texans hosted the 1-1 Buccaneers at home, looking for their first win of the 2015 season. Both Houston and Tampa Bay punted the ball on their first possession, before Houston scored first with Ryan Mallett connecting with DeAndre Hopkins for a 5-yard touchdown pass. With Randy Bullock's extra point good, the Texans took a 7–0 lead with 4:58 left in the first quarter. Tampa Bay managed to get on the board with their first possession of the 2nd quarter, with Kyle Brindza making a 58 yard long field goal to trail 3–7. Both teams punted on their next possession, with the Texans committing the first turnover of the day with a Ryan Mallett pass being intercepted by Kwon Alexander. The Buccaneers capitalized on the turnover in just 50 seconds, with Jameis Winston throwing a 32-yard pass to Charles Sims. With Brindza missing the extra point, Tampa Bay led Houston 9–7 with 3:51 left in the half. Receiving the ball back, Bullock missed a 43-yard field goal.

Tampa Bay received the ball to start the 2nd half, however Winston threw an interception that was caught by Quintin Demps. The Texans settled for 3 points off the turnover with Bullock making a 34-yard field goal. The kicking problems continued for the Buccaneers after Brindza missed a 41-yard field goal with 7:21 left in the 3rd, then again from 33 yards with 10:56 left to play. Following another missed field goal for Tampa Bay, Houston went 77 yards in just 5 plays to score a touchdown with an Alfred Blue 20 yard rush. With Bullock missing his 2nd extra point attempt of the season, the Texans extended their lead to 16–9 with 9:19 left to play. The Texans extended their lead with a 19-yard field goal from Bullock to lead 19–9 with 1:15 left to play. With Brindza missing his 3rd field goal of the day (this time from 57 yards), the Texans held on to secure their first win of the season. The Buccaneers were completely shut out during the second half while the Texans scored 12 unanswered points.

Week 4: at Atlanta Falcons

Ryan Mallett was named the starting quarterback for the 3rd straight game of the 2015 season for Houston. After a dismal 1st half, the Falcons led the Texans 28–0. In the fourth quarter with the Texans trailing 42–0, Mallett was pulled in favor of Brian Hoyer. Hoyer immediately performed better, passing for 2 touchdowns. However, to add insult to injury on what was already a bad day, with 1 second left to play on 4th and goal, Houston fumbled the ball with Nathan Stupar recovering it for an 84-yard touchdown. Taking the knee on a two-point conversion, the Falcons finished with a 48–21 victory.

With the disappointing loss, the Texans fell to 1–3.

Week 5: vs. Indianapolis Colts

Despite a dismal performance four days earlier, Ryan Mallett was named the starter for the Texans. On the other side, Andrew Luck was inactive for the second week in a row, nursing a shoulder injury. Despite suffering from a viral infection, Matt Hasselbeck was named the starting quarterback for the Colts.

Off to a promising start, Houston turned over the ball inside the red zone after a Mallett pass to Arian Foster was tipped and caught by Mike Adams. Indianapolis capitalized on the turnover with a 48-yard field goal from Adam Vinatieri to take a 3–0 lead with 6:32 left in the 1st. The Colts further extended their lead with a 4-yard pass from Hasselbeck to former Texan Andre Johnson to lead 10–0 with 1:27 left in the first. Ending the 1st quarter, Houston trailed 0–10 with the ball on their own 34.

On their second play of the 2nd quarter, the Texans punted the ball away on 4th and 1. Houston caught a break following a chop-block penalty against Frank Gore that made it 1st and 25 for Indianapolis near midfield. On 3rd and 22 a roughing the passer call against J. J. Watt gave the Colts a 1st down that put them in the red zone. On 3rd down Hasselbeck threw to T. Y. Hilton, who dropped the ball for an incomplete pass. After the play, Indianapolis head coach Chuck Pagano drew a 15-yard penalty after rushing the field. After a series of penalties, the Colts settled for a 42-yard Vinatieri field goal to lead 13–0 with 7:41 remaining in the half. A roughing the passer call against the Colts gave the Texans an automatic 1st down on what would have been 3rd down. After Mallett was slow to get up, Brian Hoyer came in at the quarterback position. On 3rd and 10 Hoyer picked up the 1st down passing 24 yards to DeAndre Hopkins. Hoyer connected with Hopkins once again to pick up a long 1st down conversion to put the Texans in the red zone. A chop block penalty pushed Houston back to the 31 for a 2nd and 21. Houston finally got on the board with a 36-yard field goal from Nick Novak to trail 3–13 with 2:08 left in the first half. With no timeouts left, Hoyer completed a 95-yard drive with a 42-yard Hail Mary pass to Jaelen Strong to trail 9-13. With Novak's kick good, Houston trailed Indianapolis 10-13 going into halftime.

Receiving the ball to start off the first half, the Colts quickly marched down field to score a touchdown on the opening play. With 13:02 left in the 3rd, Indianapolis extended their lead to 20–10. The Texans were not as lucky as an offensive pass-interference call against Hopkins put Houston into a three-and-out. On the Colts' next possession Houston's defense forced them into their first 3-and-out of the night. On the Texans' next possession Hoyer connected with Strong once again for a touchdown. With Novak making the extra point, Houston trailed 17–20 with 4:03 left in the 3rd. Making their first 3rd conversion of the night, the Colts continued to march down the field to hold their 20–17 lead at the end of the 3rd.

With a face-mask penalty called against Jadeveon Clowney, the Colts came closer to the Houston red zone. However, on the next play an offside penalty was called against Indianapolis. An interception was over-called following a holding penalty against Houston. On the next play the Texans were penalized again with a pass interference call against Kareem Jackson, making it 1st and goal from the Houston 1 for the Colts. Hasselbeck connected with Johnson to make it 26–17. With Vinatieri making the extra point, Indianapolis extended their lead to 27–17 with 10:28 left to play. Receiving the ball, Foster gained 32 yards to put Houston into Indianapolis territory, keeping hopes of a comeback alive. The Texans ended the drive with a 49-yard field goal from Novak to trail 20–27 with 6:07 left to play. Houston kicked the ball back to Indianapolis, who took the touchback. The Colts punted the ball back with 3:39 left to play, with the Texans returning it to their own 36. By the 2-minute warning Houston had reached Indianapolis territory at the Colts' 38. On the play following the 2 minute warning, Hoyer threw an interception that was picked off by Adams. Indianapolis held onto the ball and ran the clock out to win, 27–20.

Week 6: at Jacksonville Jaguars

After both teams punted the ball on their first possession, Houston started their 2nd drive from their own 1 yard line. The Texans finished the drive with Brian Hoyer throwing 14 yards to Arian Foster for a touchdown. With Nick Novak making the extra point, the Texans took a 7–0 lead with 1:36 left in the 1st. Jacksonville got their first score of the day with Blake Bortles passing 2 yards to Allen Robinson for a touchdown. With Jason Myers making the extra point, the Texans and Jaguars were tied 7–7 with 9:41 left in the 2nd. Houston responded on their next possession with Novak making a 41-yard field goal to take a 10–7 lead. With just ten seconds left in the first half, Bortles threw an interception that was caught by Andre Hal inside the red zone. Leading 10–7 at the half, the Texans had their first halftime lead of the 2015 season.

Jacksonville received the ball to start out the 2nd half, with the Houston defense forcing a three-and-out. Both teams' offenses were relatively quiet throughout the 3rd quarter, with the only scoring play coming late with 10 seconds left. Bortles connected with Julius Thomas for a 29-yard touchdown pass. With Myers making the extra point, Jacksonville took a 14–10 lead going into the 4th. After Hoyer took a hard hit and was slow to get up, Ryan Mallett played a snap, before Hoyer came back in. 2 plays after coming back in, Hoyer threw a 9-yard pass to DeAndre Hopkins for a touchdown. With Novak's kick good, the Texans took a 17–14 lead. Houston extended their lead on their next possession with Hoyer throwing 26 yards to Hopkins for another touchdown. On Jacksonville's next possession, Howe caught another interception and returned it for a touchdown. With the pick-six, the Texans scored 21 unanswered points in the 4th quarter in just over 7 minutes. The Jaguars scored on an Allen Hurns 11 yard pass from Bortles. With Myers missing the extra point, Jacksonville trailed 20–31 with 4:32 left to play. The Jaguars kicked an onside kick and recovered it, however an offside penalty forced the kick to be tried again. On the second attempt, the kick went out of bounds, drawing another penalty. Houston declined the penalty and took possession of the ball. The Jaguars couldn't manage the comeback and Houston won 31–20, improving to 2–4.

Week 7: at Miami Dolphins

The Texans' offense was forced into five consecutive three-and-outs in the 1st quarter, while the Dolphins' offense scored three passing touchdowns, two of which came from at least 50 yards. After a lopsided first quarter, the Texans trailed the Dolphins 0-21. The 2nd quarter didn't start off any better for Houston, with Ryan Tannehill connecting with Lamar Miller for a 54-yard touchdown reception. With Andrew Franks making the extra point, Miami extended their lead to 28–0. The Texans sunk even lower on their next possession, with a Brian Hoyer pass being intercepted by Reshad Jones, who returned it for a touchdown. With the pick-six, the Dolphins further extended their lead to 35-0 early in the 2nd. With 7:45 left in the 2nd quarter, the Texans finally picked up their first 1st down. Finally getting into the redzone for the first time of the day, Houston turned the ball over on downs on 4th and 2. Miami answered with an 85-yard rush from Miller to extend their lead to 41–0. The score stuck going into halftime, with the Texans facing their largest halftime deficit in franchise history.

Early in the 3rd quarter, Miami fumbled the ball which was recovered by Houston defender Johnathan Joseph. The fumble recovery set up the Texans' first score of the day, with Hoyer connecting with Arian Foster. With Nick Novak missing the extra point, Houston trailed Miami 6–41 with 8:13 left in the 3rd. Foster scored again late in the 3rd, this time with a 2-yard rush. With Novak's kick good, the Texans trailed 13–41 with 1:45 left in the 3rd quarter. Houston scored again early in the 4th quarter, with Hoyer connecting with Nate Washington for a 27-yard touchdown pass. With Novak's kick good, the Texans trailed 20-41 after scoring 20 unanswered points. Miami got their first points of the 2nd half midway through the 4th, with Franks making a 53-yard field. The field goal extended the Dolphins' lead to 44–20 with 7:46 left to play. Hoyer found Washington again for a 5-yard touchdown pass. With the 2-point conversion no good, the Texans trailed 26–44 with 4:00 left to play. The Texans fell to the Dolphins 44–26, their first loss to the Dolphins in franchise history. With the loss, Houston dropped to 2–5 on the season.

Game notes
Arian Foster left the game with an Achilles tear in the 4th quarter; it was later announced that Foster would miss the rest of the season. Backup quarterback Ryan Mallett was cut from the team 2 days after the game. Mallett had missed the team's charter flight to the game and was late to a team meeting the day before. Former Texans backing quarterback T. J. Yates was named as Mallet's replacement.

Week 8: vs. Tennessee Titans

After a humiliating defeat a week before against the Dolphins, the Texans' defense looked much better holding the Titans to just a field goal in the 1st quarter. Houston's offense scored a touchdown early in the 2nd quarter to take a 7–3 lead. On the ensuing kickoff, Tennessee's Bishop Sankey fumbled the ball with Kurtis Drummond recovering it for Houston. The Texans settled for 3 off the turnover with a 38-yard field goal from Nick Novak. Late in the 3rd quarter Brian Hoyer connected with former Titan Nate Washington for a 42-yard touchdown pass, extending the Texans' lead to 17–6 with Novak making the PAT. To start out the 4th quarter, Kevin Johnson got his first career interception by picking off a Zach Mettenberger pass. Houston failed to capitalized on the turnover, however Tennessee turned the ball over after a J. J. Watt sack, giving the Texans the ball at the Titans' 10-yard line. The Texans scored another 3 points off of the turnover, with Novak making a 24-yard field goal. Houston defeated Tennessee 20-6 and improved to 3–5. Watt, Whitney Mercilus and Jared Crick combined for a total of 6 sacks for the Texans' defense.

Week 10: at Cincinnati Bengals

The game started off as a defensive battle for both teams with the first score of the game coming late in the 1st quarter. The Bengals originally went for a 32-yard field goal, but a holding penalty made it a 42-yard attempt for Mike Nugent. With the kick good, Cincinnati took a 3–0 lead with 1:33 left in the 1st. The Texans responded on their next possession with a 22-yard field goal from Nick Novak early in the 2nd to tie the game 3-3. To close out the first half, a Hail Mary pass by Texans' quarterback Brian Hoyer was intercepted in the end zone for no return. In a defensive first half, the Bengals led 6–3 at halftime. Hoyer left the game late in the 3rd quarter to be checked for a possible concussion; with Hoyer leaving T. J. Yates played his first snap for the Texans since 2013. The Texans scored the first—and only—touchdown of the game early in the 4th quarter with Yates throwing 22 yards to DeAndre Hopkins. With Novak making the PAT, the Texans took a 10–6 lead with 14:20 left to play. In the end, the Texans held on to upset the Bengals 10–6, handing the Bengals their first loss of the season.

Week 11: vs. New York Jets

T. J. Yates was named the starter for the Texans as Brian Hoyer was out due to a concussion, while former Texans Ryan Fitzpatrick and Randy Bullock made their first return to Houston since leaving the team. During the 3rd quarter, wide receiver Cecil Shorts III threw a 21-yard touchdown pass to running back Alfred Blue to put the Texans up 17–10 with Nick Novak making the extra-point. Despite losing their starting quarterback, Houston beat the Jets 24–17, extending their winning streak to a season best 3 games, their first 3-game winning streak since the 2012 season. It was their first home victory against the Jets in three tries.

Week 12: vs. New Orleans Saints

The Texans beat the Saints 24–6, extending their winning streak to 4 games. With the win, Houston went to 6–5 for their first winning record of the season. The Texans' defense didn't allow a single touchdown for New Orleans, the first time the team failed to score a touchdown since December 24, 2005.

Week 13: at Buffalo Bills

The Texans' defense was unable to withstand the Bills' rushing offense, especially in the first half, allowing over 100 rushing yards. Nonetheless, Houston managed to keep pace throughout despite not leading all game, but gave up a go-ahead touchdown by Charles Clay on the first play off the two-minute warning, followed by Dan Carpenter's 30-yard field goal to put it away for good. The Texans lost their first game following the bye week losing to Buffalo 21–30 and dropped to 6–6 on the season. This was also Houston's first loss to the Bills since 2006.

Week 14: vs. New England Patriots
Battle Red Day

The Texans and Patriots faced off on Sunday Night Football in a game with playoff implications for both teams. Houston received the opening kickoff, going into a three-and-out on the drive. On New England's second drive, Tom Brady found tight end Rob Gronkowski for a 40-yard reception to set up first and goal. To end the drive, Brady found Keshawn Martin for a 2-yard touchdown pass. With Stephen Gostkowski making the extra point the Patriots took a 7–0 lead. On 3rd and 18, Brian Hoyer found Nate Washington for a 49-yard pass to put Houston at New England's 25 yard line. The Texans ended the drive with a 37-yard field goal from Nick Novak to trail 3–7 late in the 1st quarter. The Patriots extended their lead early in the 2nd quarter to 10–3 with a 43-yard field goal from Stephen Gostkowski. After struggling to find their run game after the loss of Arian Foster, Jonathan Grimes took off for 37 yards to put the Texans at the Patriots' 43 yard line. The drive ended with another Novak field goal, this time from 45 yards. With Novak's kick good, Houston trailed 6–10 with 9:26 left in the half. To close out the first half, Tom Brady found Gronkowski for a 1-yard touchdown pass. With Gostkowski making the extra point New England extended their lead to 17–6 going into halftime.

The Texans failed to score in the 2nd half, falling to the Patriots 27–6. Hoyer left the game late in the 4th quarter due to a possible concussion, with T. J. Yates coming in as the starting quarterback.

Week 15: at Indianapolis Colts

T. J. Yates started his second game of the season for the Texans due to Brian Hoyer being out with a concussion. Both teams were held scoreless in the 1st quarter, with the Colts striking first with Matt Hasselbeck connecting with Donte Moncrief for an 11-yard touchdown reception. With Adam Vinatieri making the extra point, Indianapolis lead 7–0 late in the 2nd quarter. The Colts scored again with Vinatieri making a 29-yard field goal, extending their lead to 10–0. The Texans managed to get on the board as the half wined down with a 22-yard field goal from Nick Novak. With Novak's field goal, Houston trailed 3–10 at the half. The Texans' defense held the Colts' offense to zero points in the 2nd half, while Houston's offense scored 13 unanswered points. The Texans made history by beating the Colts in Indianapolis for the first time in franchise history, winning 16–10. Third string quarterback Brandon Weeden helped the Texans past the Colts with an 8-yard pass to Jaelen Strong late in the 4th quarter. With the win, the Texans went to 7–7 and gained sole possession of the AFC South lead. Yates suffered an ACL tear during the game, ending his season.

Week 16: at Tennessee Titans

Brandon Weeden started for the Texans as Brian Hoyer was still out due to a concussion.

Tennessee's offense struggled throughout the game, with Antonio Andrews fumbling the ball on the Titans' first possession. Quintin Demps returned the fumble 33 yards for a touchdown. Nick Novak made the extra point to put the Texans up 7–0 early in the game. Early in the 4th quarter, down 0–34, Tennessee marched all the way down to the Houston 9 yard line, the first time the Titans made their way inside the Houston 20. On 3rd and goal Tennessee quarterback Zach Mettenberger was sacked by J. J. Watt, with Mettenberger fumbling the ball and Jared Crick recovering it four Houston. The Texans failed to capitalize on the turnover, having to punt the ball away. Tennessee got their first score of the day with 1:31 left in the game, with Mettenberger connecting with Tre McBride for a 1-yard touchdown reception. The Titans decided to go for a two–point conversion, but the attempt failed. With the Texans receiving the ball back, backup quarterback B. J. Daniels took the knee to close out the game. The Texans defeated the Titans 34–6 and improved to 8–7 on the season.

Week 17: vs. Jacksonville Jaguars

Jacksonville received the opening kickoff, going –5 yards on the drive with Blake Bortles being sacked by J. J. Watt for a loss of 8 yards. The Texans didn't fare much better on their first possession, as Brian Hoyer was sacked by Jared Odrick and Peyton Thompson. Houston scored first with a 29-yard field goal from Nick Novak to lead 3–0 halfway through the first quarter. Brian Cushing forced a fumble in the 2nd quarter, with Watt recovering the ball for the Texans. Houston capitalized on the turnover with a 3-yard touchdown run from Jonathan Grimes. Bortles threw an interception late in the 2nd quarter with Andre Hal catching the pick. The Texans capitalized on the turnover with Novak making a season long 51 yard field goal. At the half, Houston led Jacksonville 20–3. With just over three minutes left in the 4th quarter, Kareem Jackson intercepted a Bortles pass, returning it 27 yards for a touchdown to make it 30–6 final.

Game notes
Offensive tackle Duane Brown left the game late in the 1st quarter with a left knee injury. Brown was carted off the field, quickly being ruled out for the remainder of the game. With the win, the Texans clinched their 3rd AFC South title and gained their 3rd trip to the postseason.

Postseason

AFC Wild Card Playoffs: vs. (5) Kansas City Chiefs

The Chiefs received the opening kickoff, with Knile Davis returning it 106 yards for a touchdown. With Cairo Santos making the extra point, Kansas City took a 7–0 lead. On the Texans' second drive, a Brian Hoyer pass was intercepted by Eric Berry. Two plays later, Chiefs quarterback Alex Smith threw an interception that was picked off by linebacker Brian Cushing, Cushing's first pick since week 1 of the 2013 season. Houston came up empty off of the Kansas City turnover, as Hoyer lost control of the ball on a 3rd down play in Chiefs' territory, fumbling it with Dontari Poe recovering for Kansas City. The Chiefs scored 3 off of the Hoyer fumble, with Cairo Santos making a 49-yard field goal to put Kansas City up 10–0 early in the 2nd. Santos later made another 49-yard field goal to extend the Chiefs' lead to 13–0. Houston found the redzone of Kansas City for the first time with a 49-yard run from Alfred Blue. This was short lived as Hoyer threw another interception on 3rd and goal, with Josh Mauga getting the pick. Houston got the ball back, but Hoyer threw another interception on the play following the 2 minute warning, with Marcus Peters on the pick. The Chiefs led 13–0 at the half, with Brian Hoyer turning it over 4 times in the first half with fans booing him going into the locker room.

Houston made it into Kansas City territory coming out of the locker room, but came up short on the drive, having to settle for another punt from Shane Lechler. J. J. Watt almost sacked Smith on the next play, who took off for a 63-yard run that was called back due to offensive holding. The Chiefs got their first offensive touchdown of the day with Smith connecting to Chris Conley for a 9-yard touchdown pass; with Santos making the extra point, Kansas City extended their lead to 20–0. The Chiefs extended their lead once again with a 9-yard rush from Spencer Ware early in the 4th quarter. Hoyer fumbled the ball once again in the Chiefs' territory on 4th and 7, recovering it only to be tackled for a turnover on downs. The Texans suffered both their first Wild Card loss and home shutout loss in franchise history, falling to the Chiefs 0–30.

Standings

Division

Conference

Statistics
Team

IndividualSource''':

References

External links
 

Houston
Houston Texans seasons
Houston Texans
AFC South championship seasons